Guerville may refer to:

People 
 Amédée Baillot de Guerville (1869–1913), French-American journalist and travel writer
 Harny de Guerville, French playwright

Places 
 Guerville, Seine-Maritime, France
 Guerville, Yvelines, France